Feena may refer to:

Feena (Grandia), a character in the video game Grandia
Feena, a character in the video game Ys I & II
Feena Fam Earthlight, a character in the visual novel Yoake Mae yori Ruriiro na